Jack Dale was an American college football and college basketball coach. He served as the head football coach at the First District Agricultural and Mechanical College—now known as Arkansas State University—from 1931 to 1932, compiling a record of 9–6. Dale was also the head basketball coach at First District A&M from 1931 to 1933, tallying a mark of 20–15.

Head coaching record

Football

References

Year of birth missing
Year of death missing
Arkansas State Red Wolves football coaches
Arkansas State Red Wolves men's basketball coaches